The Flag of Magallanes y la Antártica Chilena Region is one of the regional symbols of the Chilean Magallanes y la Antártica Chilena Region. This flag was adopted in 1997 by the regional government, also with the Regional Coat of Arms.

Design and symbolism
The regional flag is a blue field, in the bottom of which stands a golden strip highlighting six peaks, which are covered on top by a white border. On top of these, and in front of blue background, is placed the Southern Cross on a slant and white stars.

According to the official symbolism, the blue color represents the night sky, while the golden peaks symbolize the steppe region, while white indicates the snow that often falls in winter. The Southern Cross symbolizes the position of the area.

Use
This flag must be hoisted in all private and public buildings in September 21 (Remembrance of Magellan Strait Discovery by Ferdinand Magellan), September 29 (Annexation of Magallanes to Chile) and October 21 (Regional Day).

Currently, the regional flag is the only frequently used by the inhabitants of the concerned region, having in recent years a great popularity among Magellan people, particularly with the emergence of a regionalist movement in the zone, denounced by detractors as separatism.

References

External links
Explication about the Magellan Flag 

Magallanes Region
Magallanes
Southern Cross flags
Magallanes